Devimane is a Hill station and High altitude  village in Sirsi taluk of Malenadu region  in Karnataka, The road to reach this Hill Station is named as Devimane Ghat lies in NH 766E ultimately connecting Malenadu city Sirsi and Karavali town Kumta. Being under the lush forest zone in Uttara Kannada District it consists of 10 hairpin curves currently with a well-engineered road that reduces the risk of accidents. 
A temple of Goddess Durga Devi is at the beginning of this road at elevation 429m, The ghat section was named after the temple "Devimane", meaning "the home of goddess Devi". There are 5 hairpins curves between Devimane Temple and Sampakhanda. So,  Totally there are 15 Hairpin Turns in this stretch of road.

After entering the Western Ghats, there are many sharp curves until Ekkambi. On the Deccan Plateau, three hairpin curves exist between Ekkambi and Sirsi.
There are 12 bridges in this ghat section. At this point, the road becomes signed SH69/SH142 and is maintained by the Karnataka State Highway works department.
The ghat section has been posing a threat to the wildlife present in the slopes of Western Ghat mountain range. Wild animals, including elephants, were hit by vehicles at certain times of the day.

Climate 
During the months of May, June, July, August, September this region receives heavy rainfall over 6000mm. Villages near Devimane ghat are Hebre, Bandla, Devimane, Hebbail, Kodambale, Sampakhanda receives over 5000mm of rainfall each year creating numerous rivers and waterfalls.

Due to the proximity of ocean the low elevated regions experience high-temperature rise over 40 °C during summer. But, in higher elevated regions the temperature would not go beyond 32 °C due to the presence of dense forest range caused by heavy rainfall.

Winter season commences from November and ends in February, as it lies in the high elevated region and close to the ocean it experiences Tropical Highland climate and it experiences shivery climate where the temperature drops below 10 °C and Sampakhanda being the coldest place where the temperature has dropped below 5 °C many times and even in summer season temperature often drops below 12 °C. Since the weather statistics have poor track in this region, perfection in the weather numbers has certain deviations. Even in lowland region near Devimane Ghat experiences cold during winter but temperature unusually drops below 15 °C.

See also
 Ghat Roads
 Karwar
 Mangalore
 Sirsi

References

External links 

Villages in Uttara Kannada district